was a Japanese politician, in the House of Representatives in the Diet (national legislature) as a member of the Democratic Party of Japan. He was born in Seoul, when Korea was under Japanese rule. He attended Tokyo Union Theological Seminary, earning a master's degree. In 1990 he was elected for the first time as a member of the Japan Socialist Party.

References

External links 
  in Japanese

1939 births
2016 deaths
People from Seoul
Members of the House of Representatives (Japan)
Japanese clergy
Members of the United Church of Christ in Japan
Social Democratic Party (Japan) politicians
Democratic Party of Japan politicians
21st-century Japanese politicians